Southern Terminal Redoubt is a historic archaeological site located at Newport News, Virginia. It is a uniquely intact component that represents the southern end of General John B. Magruder's defensive Warwick Line.  It is a relatively small defensive earthwork that constitutes one of the few surviving and undisturbed remnants of the 1862 Peninsula Campaign in Virginia.  It is representative of a major military feat significant to the outcome of the American Civil War and exemplifies diverse types of defensive adaptation. An archaeological investigation of this site could yield new insights into Civil War military architecture.

It was listed on the National Register of Historic Places in 1983.

References

Military facilities on the National Register of Historic Places in Virginia
Archaeological sites on the National Register of Historic Places in Virginia
National Register of Historic Places in Newport News, Virginia
Redoubts
1862 establishments in Virginia